The 1993–94 NBA season was the Pistons' 46th season in the National Basketball Association, and 37th season in the city of Detroit. In the 1993 NBA draft, the Pistons selected Lindsey Hunter out of Jackson State with the tenth pick, and selected Allan Houston from the University of Tennessee with the eleventh pick. During the off-season, the Pistons acquired Sean Elliott from the San Antonio Spurs, signed free agent Greg Anderson, and hired Don Chaney as head coach. 

Although the Pistons started out 5–4 without Alvin Robertson, who was out with a back injury and then traded to the Denver Nuggets in November. The Pistons continued to struggle as Bill Laimbeer retired after playing just eleven games after an ugly practice scuffle with Isiah Thomas. Laimbeer averaged 9.8 points and 5.1 rebounds per game this season. Things got worse as the team suffered a 14-game losing streak between December and January, and held an 11–37 record at the All-Star break. At midseason, Olden Polynice was traded to the Sacramento Kings in exchange for Pete Chilcutt, as the Pistons lost their final 13 games of the season, finishing tied for last place in the Central Division with a 20–62 record, their worst record since 1979–80. 

Joe Dumars led the team in scoring with 20.4 points per game, while Terry Mills averaged 17.3 points and 8.4 rebounds per game, and Elliott provided the team with 12.1 points per game. Hunter contributed 10.3 points, 4.8 assists and 1.5 steals per game, and was named the NBA All-Rookie Second Team, while Houston provided with 8.5 points per game off the bench, and Anderson averaged 6.4 points and 7.4 rebounds per game.

This season marked an end of an era as Thomas retired, ending his thirteen-year career with the Pistons. In his final season, Thomas averaged 14.8 points and 6.9 assists per game in 58 games. His final game was a 132–104 home loss to the Orlando Magic on April 19, 1994, where he ruptured his Achilles tendon, which forced him to retire. Also following the season, Elliott would return to his former team, the San Antonio Spurs after playing just one season with the Pistons, while Anderson signed with the Atlanta Hawks, and Chilcutt signed with the Houston Rockets.

Draft picks

Roster

Roster Notes
Center Bill Laimbeer retired on December 1.

Regular season

Season standings

z - clinched division title
y - clinched division title
x - clinched playoff spot

Record vs. opponents

Game log

Player statistics

Player Statistics Citation:

Awards and records
Lindsey Hunter, NBA All-Rookie Team 2nd Team

Transactions

References

See also
1993-94 NBA season

Detroit Pistons seasons
Detroit
Detroit
Detroit